Sherwin Merle "Bud" Swartz (June 13, 1929 – June 24, 1991) was a Major League Baseball pitcher who played for the St. Louis Browns in . He was born in Tulsa, Oklahoma, and was Jewish. He attended University High School in Los Angeles, California.

A single in his only at-bat at 18 years of age left Swartz with a rare major league career batting average of 1.000. He pitched in five games, and gave up four earned runs in  innings.

References

External links

1929 births
1991 deaths
Baseball players from Oklahoma
Burials at Hillside Memorial Park Cemetery
Jewish American baseball players
Jewish Major League Baseball players
Major League Baseball pitchers
Sportspeople from Tulsa, Oklahoma
St. Louis Browns players
20th-century American Jews
Aberdeen Pheasants players
Globe-Miami Browns players
Portland Beavers players
Riverside Rubes players
Springfield Browns players
Wichita Falls Spudders players
University High School (Los Angeles) alumni